Arne Carl Maier (born 8 January 1999) is a German professional footballer who plays as a midfielder for  club FC Augsburg. He represented the Germany national under-21 team.

Club career
On 24 May 2022, Maier moved to FC Augsburg on a three-year contract with an option to extend, after playing at the club on loan in the previous season.

Career statistics

Honours
Germany U21
UEFA European Under-21 Championship: 2021; runner-up: 2019

Individual
UEFA European Under-21 Championship Team of the Tournament: 2021
Fritz Walter U17 bronze medal: 2016
Fritz Walter U19 silver medal: 2018

References

External links

1999 births
Living people
People from Ludwigsfelde
Footballers from Brandenburg
German footballers
Germany youth international footballers
Germany under-21 international footballers
Olympic footballers of Germany
Association football midfielders
Hertha BSC players
Hertha BSC II players
Arminia Bielefeld players
FC Augsburg players
Bundesliga players
Regionalliga players
Footballers at the 2020 Summer Olympics